The 2009 24 Hours of Le Mans was the 77th Grand Prix of Endurance, an endurance auto race run over 24 hours. It took place at the Circuit de la Sarthe, Le Mans, France, and was organised by the Automobile Club de l'Ouest (ACO) over 13–14 June  2009 and was started by Fiat and Ferrari chairman Luca Cordero di Montezemolo at 15:00 local time (13:00 UTC). A test day was initially scheduled for 31 May that year, but was canceled by the ACO due to economic concerns. The race was attended by 234,800 spectators.

Peugeot succeeded in winning the race in the third year of the 908 HDi FAP program with drivers David Brabham, Marc Gené, and Alexander Wurz driving the No. 9 car for 382 laps; an all-French driving squad secured second place for Peugeot as well. Audi, who had won eight of the last ten Le Mans, finished third in their new R15 TDI. Team Essex gave Porsche their second LMP2 victory in a row, while the American Corvette Racing team earned their first GT1 win since . Risi Competizione Ferrari led the GT2 category for their second straight victory in the class.

Schedule
Events for the 24 Hours of Le Mans began on 8 June with technical inspections, before initial practice began on 10 June. Due to the cancellation of the May test session, the Wednesday track session has been altered to free practice only, with no qualification times being recorded in the mostly wet session. Qualifying therefore only took place on Thursday, which remained dry.

Entries

Automatic invitations
Automatic entry to the 2009 24 Hours of Le Mans was granted to teams that had performed well in the previous year's 24 Hours of Le Mans, as well as the 2008 seasons of the American Le Mans Series, Le Mans Series, FIA GT Championship, and the Petit Le Mans. New for 2009 was an automatic invitation awarded to the team which accumulated the most points in the Michelin Energy Endurance Challenge, as part of the Le Mans Series. The award was based on fuel economy of competitors during each event.

On 20 January 2009, the ACO announced that 15 of the 29 automatic invitations had been accepted by their recipients. Entries with a blue background were granted entries, but did not accept their invitations.

1. Due to Audi Sport North America already earning two entries (first in previous 24 Hours of Le Mans and first at Petit Le Mans), they could not receive the automatic invitation for also winning the American Le Mans Series championship. The entry was instead given to the team which finished second in the championship.

2. Due to Corvette Racing already earning two entries (second in previous 24 Hours of Le Mans and first at Petit Le Mans), they could not receive the automatic invitation for also winning the American Le Mans Series championship. The entry was instead given to the team which finished second in the championship.

Applications
Prior to the deadline for applications, 82 separate entries by teams representing 17 countries were received by the ACO. This amount is only six less than the total of applications received for the previous running of the 24 Hours of Le Mans. The ACO Selection Committee decided on which teams were invited to fill the remaining 40 positions alongside those teams who had already received automatic invitations, along with ten reserve entries.

Entry list
On 26 February, the ACO announced their list of 55 entries which will be invited to take part in the 2009 24 Hours of Le Mans. 21 cars within the LMP1 category include Audi, Peugeot, and Aston Martin with three cars each, as well as private entries for the Kolles Audis, Pescarolo Peugeot, and Speedy-Sebah Aston Martin. This also made a total of nine cars which would be using diesel fuel. LMP2 featured previous race winners Team Goh in a previous winning car, the Porsche RS Spyder, joined by last year's runner-up Team Essex. Mazda supplied engines for four entries, split amongst the Lola and Pescarolo chassis.

The GT1 category was fought amongst three manufacturers, as Corvette Racing and Luc Alphand Aventures attempted to overcome the two private Aston Martin and Lamborghini entries. GT2 was once again dominated by the Ferrari and Porsche battle, although Ferrari had the power of numbers with its ten entries compared to Porsche's five. Sole entries from Spyker and the Drayson Aston Martin completed the GT2 field.

Reserve entries
Ten entries are granted a reserve entry, in case an entry from the list of 55 withdraws prior to the event. These ten entries will be allowed to join the race entry list in the order they are listed here, regardless of their class.

On 31 March, Gigawave Motorsport withdrew their Aston Martin from the GT1 category of the entry list in order to concentrate on their development of the Nissan GT-R program. This promoted Advanced Engineering/Team Seattle from the reserve list to the entry list. Three days later Epsilon Euskadi withdrew their LMP1 entry which was replaced by the Endurance China Team. Epsilon Euskadi also withdrew their second entry from the reserve list. On 29 April, it was announced that Vitaphone Racing withdrew their LMP2 entry and was replaced by a second IMSA Performance Matmut GT2 entry. Racing Box also announced that they withdrew their LMP2 reserve entry. IPB Spartak Racing announced their withdrawal from the event on 15 May because one of their drivers, Peter Kox, was unable to participate in the race. It was replaced by the Barazi-Epsilon LMP2 entry.

On 22 May, reserve entries were no longer able to be accepted into the race, regardless of further withdrawals. The entries of Gerard Welter's WR-Zytek LMP2, Team Felbermayr-Proton's Porsche GT2, Snoras Spyker Squadron's Spyker GT2, and Larbre Compétition's Saleen GT1 were the only remaining reserves at the time of the entry list closure.

Free practice
After the cancellation of the test session, Wednesday's schedule was changed from a qualifying session to a six-hour free practice. Track conditions varied as rain arrived several times during the practice, limiting the amount of time available with a dry circuit. Audi led the session with Allan McNish setting a fastest lap of 3:30.708 in the No. 1 car, followed immediately by the No. 2 Audi. The best Peugeot was the No. 9 car, followed immediately by the privately entered Pescarolo Sport Peugeot.  The fastest LMP1 not running a diesel engine was the second Pescarolo entry with a time of 3:35.868, followed by the No. 008 and No. 007 Aston Martins.

The LMP2 category was led by the Porsche RS Spyders, with Team Essex's 3:46.426 ahead of the Navi Team Goh entry. Quifel ASM Team's Ginetta-Zytek was a distant third, ten seconds behind Team Essex. Corvette Racing were at the front of GT1, with the No. 63's 3:57.876 lap time ahead of the No. 64 car. Jetalliance Racing were third while the two Luc Alphand Corvettes did few laps after fixing an incorrectly installed rollcage and the JLOC Lamborghini did not complete a lap after breaking a driveshaft. Porsche were ahead of Ferrari in the GT2 category, with Felbermayr-Proton ahead of the Risi Competizione. Spyker Squadron were able to reach third in the class.

The only major incident of the practice session was an accident by KSM's driver Jean de Pourtales. The driver spun approaching the Dunlop Chicane, impacting a concrete barrier before sliding into a tire barrier. The second impact ripped much of the rear of the car off.

Qualifying
Stéphane Sarrazin claimed his third consecutive pole position at Le Mans, planting the No. 8 Peugeot at the front of the field with a lap time of 3:22.888. He set the lap on the third of his flying laps during a run near the end of the four-hour qualifying session, bettering Allan McNish's lap time by 0.8 seconds. McNish's lap was set on the final lap of the first two-hour qualifying session, beating the Peugeot of Franck Montagny who led much of the first session. McNish's lap remained at the top of the charts for much of the second session until Sarrazin's performance. Peugeot planned to practice race setups during the entire qualifying session, and were not seeking to obtain the pole position.

At the end of qualifying Peugeots filled the next three places on the grid behind the front row with the car of Pescarolo Sport settling in at fourth fastest. Aston Martin were able to secure the fastest lap for a petrol-powered car, with the No. 007 entry on a few thousandths of a second behind the No. 3 Audi and followed by the No. 008 Aston Martin and No. 13 Speedy Racing Team Sebah Aston Martin.

The Porsche RS Spyders continued their dominance in the LMP2 category, with Casper Elgaard of Team Essex ahead of Team Goh with a lap time of 3:37.720. Third in the category was the No. 33 Speedy Racing Team Sebah Lola-Judd which was over three seconds behind the Porsches. Corvette Racing secured the front row in the GT1 category, with Jan Magnussen's No. 63 entry half a second ahead of the No. 64 sister car. Jetalliance Racing's privately entered Aston Martin was under two seconds behind, and followed immediately by the two Luc Alphand Corvettes. The JLOC Lamborghini struggled with mechanical issues and was never able to lift itself from last place on grid.

The GT2 category was led by Porsche who bested their rivals Ferrari with two cars. Pole winner Flying Lizard Motorsports' 4:03.202 was less than a tenth of a second ahead of the No. 77 Felbermayr-Proton car. Risi Competizione led the Ferrari fight with a third place qualifying time, joined by JMB Racing and BMS Scuderia Italia. The Aston Martin of Drayson Racing was ninth in the category, while the Spyker was eleventh.

Several incidents occurred during the qualifying session. The Pescarolo Peugeot drive by Jean-Christophe Boullion spun at the Tetre Rouge corner and ripped the left front fender off the car after impacting the wall. The Peugeot was able to return to the pits and be repaired. The No. 007 Aston Martin also hit a wall after losing control during braking for the second chicane on the Mulsanne Straight. The incident occurred in the closing minutes of qualifying, but the car was repaired.

Qualifying results

Class leaders are in bold.

Race
New rules have caused the diesels to become considerably slower than the previous year. Peugeot qualified 4 seconds slower than 2008 but still maintained the speed advantage over the new Audi R15. Audi's lack of testing meant that the cars struggled to get any sort of a good setup. All works drivers complained about understeer in the Le Mans aero package on the R15. Tom Kristensen commented that the high-downforce package like the one used at Sebring were much better. The R15 also struggled to get beyond a double-stint.

The race began at 15:00 local time (UTC+2) 13 June 2009, with Franck Montagny in the pole position Peugeot 908 HDi FAP leading the field.  The race was started by the waving of the French tricolour by Fiat and Ferrari chairman Luca Cordero di Montezemolo, honoring the 60th anniversary of Ferrari's first victory at Le Mans.

In the LMP1 class, the Peugeots showed they could maintain a pace that the Audis struggled to maintain over the full run. The #7 Peugeot was released too early and hit from the side by the Pescarolo Peugeot. The initial damage was a small puncture but the resulting damage destroyed the whole left rear end of the car. Two of the three Audis had off-track excursions in the first 12 hours; one resulting in the #2 car being out of the race on lap 104.  During the early evening, the #1 Audi lost a lap to the leading Peugeot. Further technical issues would see it lose another seven laps in total to the winner.  In LMP2, the Navi Team Goh Porsche RS Spyder qualified 2nd overall and maintained a solid pace until crashing heavily with one hour to go, allowing the pole-sitting #31 Team Essex Porsche to carry on to the win.

In GT1, the final outing of the Chevrolet Corvette C6.R as a factory team at Le Mans ended well, with the #63 car driven by O'Connell, Magnussen and García sitting on the pole and finishing first in class.  Magnussen was sick early on, which left O'Connell and Garcia to finish the race as a two-driver team.  Several other teams were stricken with the loss of a driver, most notable being the LMP1 #009 Lola-Aston, whose driver Stuart Hall was excluded when he collided with the LMP2 #26 Radical, and the stewards determined his fault to be substantial. Another team with a driver that was excluded was Kolles' Narain Karthikeyan as he dislocated his shoulder going over the pitwall before the race, leaving Charles Zwolsman Jr. and André Lotterer to do the whole 24 hours, yet they finished a respectable 7th in P1 and 7th overall.

In GT2, Ferrari celebrated their 60th Anniversary win with Ferraris taking the first 4 spots, the Risi Competizione #82 Ferrari F430 heading the class.

New rules requiring only one man with one airgun in the pits were aimed to lower the overall costs of the event by causing teams to double or triple stint tires due to the time needed to replace them.

Race results
Class winners are marked in bold.  Cars running at the finish but failing to complete 70% of the winner's distance are marked as Not Classified.

Statistics
 Fastest Lap – #7 Peugeot 908 HDi FAP – 3:24.352
 Best speed – Peugeot 908 HDi FAP – 341 km/h
 Distance – 5206.28 km

Peugeot protest

On Monday, 8 June, following scrutineering and approval of the Audi R15 TDI by the ACO, Peugeot Sport director Olivier Quesnel stated that the team may file a protest over the legality of certain elements of the R15 TDI's design.  This protest was officially filed two days later, immediately before the start of practice.  Peugeot believes that the R15 features aerodynamic elements on the front of the car which violate the ACO's regulations about devices which may increase the amount of front downforce.  Peugeot, as well as fellow competitors Aston Martin Racing and Oreca, initially questioned these aerodynamic elements at the 2009 12 Hours of Sebring in March, but were assured that the ACO would evaluate them prior to Le Mans.

Later that night, Peugeot received a response from the ACO stating that it would not uphold the protest.  The ACO stated that they have the ability through their own regulations to determine if an aerodynamic element's sole purpose is to create downforce.  Peugeot responded within an hour by appealing this decision. A decision on this appeal however would not be made until after the race had taken place, thus allowing Audi to continue to compete.  Audi stated that they believed the matter was between Peugeot and the ACO, and that their car was legal.

Following the race, Peugeot announced that they were withdrawing their appeal of the scrutineer's decision.  Peugeot cited a planned increase in communication between manufacturers and the ACO as their reasoning for the withdrawal.

References

External links

 Official website of the 24 Hours of Le Mans

24 Hours of Le Mans races
Le Mans
24 Hours of Le Mans
Le Mans